The Hart 1030 is a four-stroke, naturally aspirated, 3.0-litre, V10 racing engine, designed, developed and tuned by Brian Hart of Hart Racing Engines, between  and . It was the last engine to be tuned and made by Hart, and the last engine to use design knowledge and technological property of Hart Racing Engines. It produced , and was used solely by the Arrows team, but proved to be unsuccessful. The best results for the engine were a 4-6 finish at Monaco for Mika Salo and Pedro Diniz (respectively), a 5th-place finish for Pedro Diniz at infamous rain-soaked Belgian Grand Prix, and a 6th-place finish for Pedro de la Rosa at Australia, in 1999.

Applications
Arrows A19
Arrows A20

References

V10 engines
Formula One engines